Road to the Stars is a 1957, Soviet film directed by Pavel Klushantsev. It combines elements of science education films and speculative science fiction. The film was groundbreaking for its use of special effects to depict life in space.

Synopsis 

The first half of the film is historical and educational in nature, depicting mostly the life and scientific contributions of Konstantin Tsiolkovsky, along with the basic principles of rocket propulsion, ballistics, and space flight. It also depicts the contributions of Max Valier and Robert Goddard.

The second half of the film is speculative in nature, with various scenes showing crewed space flight (4 years before the flight of Yuri Gagarin), a large space station (in great detail), and the first person on the Moon (12 years before the flight of Apollo 11), as well as lunar colonization.

Cast  
 Giorgy Solovyov — Konstantin Tsiolkovsky

Crew 
 Writers — Boris Liapunov, Vasily Solovyov
 Director — Pavel Klushantsev
 Operator — Mikael Galper
 Composer — S. Shatiryan
 Artist — M. Tsybasov
 Sound Engineer — RP Leviti
 Operators animation — A.V. Lavrentiev and A. M. Romanenko
 Animation artist — V. Shelkov

Art features 
The film was far ahead of its time in terms of cinematic special effects. In particular, it features a wheel-shaped space station eleven years before Kubrick's famous 1968 film 2001: A Space Odyssey.

Awards 
 1958. 2nd prize at CCF I (Moscow)
 1958. Bronze medal: Б. Kudricha MCF technical and scientific films Belgrade.

Legacy
The film  is believed to have significantly influenced Stanley Kubrick's techniques in 2001: A Space Odyssey, particularly in its accurate depiction of weightlessness and a rotating space station. Encyclopedia Astronautica describes some scenes from 2001 as a "shot-for-shot duplication of Road to the Stars". Specific comparisons of shots from the two films have been analyzed by the filmmaker Alessandro Cima.  A 1994 article in American Cinematographer says, "When Stanley Kubrick made 2001: a Space Odyssey in 1968, he claimed to have been first to fly actor/astronauts on wires with the camera on the ground, shooting vertically while the actor's body covered the wires" but observes that Klushantsev had preceded him in this.

References

External links 
 Jan Ivanovich Koltunov: О фильме «Дорога к звёздам
 Дорога к звёздам (1957)—full film

Soviet popular science films
1950s science fiction films
Soviet science fiction films
Space adventure films
Films directed by Pavel Klushantsev